The Need of Being Versed in Country Things is a short poem by Robert Frost. It was published in 1923 in his New Hampshire poetry collection. The poem contains six quatrains with an ABCB rhyme scheme.

Poem

Analysis

The first quatrain, "Observing a Burned-Out Home", talks about a house burning down. The narrator also imagines a flower, representative of the chimney that wasn't destroyed in the fire.

The second quatrain, "An Abandoned Farm", talks about how if the wind had been blowing in a different direction, the barn of the narrator would have burned down as well. The narrator personifies the wind by saying that it has a very strong will, and wouldn't let the barn burn down. This shows that the narrator believes in a strong connection between the physical world and the world of nature.
 
The third quatrain, "No Longer an Active Farm", shows the melancholy the narrator is feeling after the barn burned down, and how even though it is still up, it isn't functioning like it used to.

The fourth quatrain, "Refocusing on the House", tells of birds flying out from the burned home and that the flapping of these birds is akin to the human sigh, again showing the connection that the narrator thinks humans and nature have.

The fifth quatrain, "Happened Long Ago", reveals to the reader that the fire was something that happened long ago, and although some flowers have started blooming again, the abandoned farm is still a lonely place.

The sixth quatrain, "Melancholy Despite the Birds", starts with the narrator talking about how despite all the destruction around him, the birds are still happy to have a place to nest, but "One would have to be versed in country things" to think that these birds haven't wept, hinting at the fact that he doesn't know everything about country things.

References 

1923 poems
Poetry by Robert Frost